Storheia is the highest mountain in Bymarka in the municipality of Trondheim in Trøndelag county, Norway. The smaller mountain Gråkallen lies just to the northeast.

Name
The first element is stor which means "big" and the last element is the finite form of hei which means "upland" or "hill".

References

Mountains of Trøndelag
Geography of Trondheim